The Gold-Laden Sheep and The Sacred Mountain is a Nepalese mystery drama film directed by Ridham Janve.

Plot
Two shepherds living on top of an unknown mountain go searching for an aircraft that crash landed somewhere nearby even as different teams sent by the aircraft's team get lost on the mountain.

Shooting
The film was shot for 21 days in high Himalaya using equipment powered by portable battery that was charged by solar energy.

Sound design
The film uses very minimal background score and Sound designer Bigyna Dahal used specific ambiance sounds from the location. Director Ridham Janve and Bigyna Dahal has spent 20 additional days in the remote mountains with a custom made solar power house for MixPre-10T to record these sounds.

Release
The film was released in India on 4 November 2018 at Dharamshala International Film Festival and worldwide on 28 January 2019 at International Film Festival Rotterdam.

Cast
 Lokendra Gurung
 Arjun Pant

Awards
2019 Asia Pacific Screen Awards - Nominated for Best Feature Film
2019 Mumbai Film Festival

References

External links
 

2010s Nepali-language films
2010s Hindi-language films
2018 films
Nepalese drama films
Indian multilingual films
Nepalese multilingual films